Charles Frederick Theodore Snelling (born September 17, 1937 in Toronto) is a Canadian former figure skater. He is the 1954-1958 & 1964 Canadian national champion and the 1957 World bronze medalist. He is the youngest ever men's Canadian national champion, as he was 16 at the time of his win in March 1954. He graduated from the University of Toronto Schools.

Snelling placed 8th at the 1956 Winter Olympics. In 1958, he retired from skating to attend medical school at the University of Toronto, but after graduation he returned to competitive skating and competed at the 1964 Winter Olympics. In 2005, he was inducted into the Skate Canada Hall of Fame. He lives in Vancouver, B.C. He is a retired burns and plastics specialist.

Results

References

 
 Skate Canada: Canadian Championships

1937 births
Living people
Canadian male single skaters
Olympic figure skaters of Canada
Figure skaters at the 1956 Winter Olympics
Figure skaters at the 1964 Winter Olympics
Figure skaters from Toronto
World Figure Skating Championships medalists